Wurmbea deserticola is a species of plant in the Colchicaceae family that is endemic to Australia.

Description
The species is a cormous perennial herb that grows to a height of 7–25 cm. Its pink-white flowers appear from May to December.

Distribution and habitat
The species is found in the Central Ranges, Gascoyne, Gibson Desert, Great Victoria Desert, Little Sandy Desert and Murchison IBRA bioregions of Western Australia, its range extending just over the border to the south-western Northern Territory. It grows on sand dunes as well as red sand, lateritic loam and rocky soils.

References

deserticola
Monocots of Australia
Flora of Western Australia
Flora of the Northern Territory
Plants described in 1980
Taxa named by Terry Desmond Macfarlane